William Schuster Dornelles da Silva (born 31 May 1987), known as William Schuster, is a Brazilian footballer who plays as a midfielder for Novo Hamburgo.

References

External links
 
 
 

1987 births
Living people
Footballers from Porto Alegre
Brazilian footballers
Association football midfielders
Campeonato Brasileiro Série A players
Clube Atlético do Porto players
Esporte Clube Novo Hamburgo players
Grêmio Foot-Ball Porto Alegrense players
Paraguayan Primera División players
Club Atlético 3 de Febrero players
Muaither SC players
Club Guaraní players
Independiente F.B.C. footballers
Sportivo Luqueño players
12 de Octubre Football Club players
Venezuelan Primera División players
Deportivo Miranda F.C. players
Brazilian expatriate footballers
Brazilian expatriate sportspeople in Paraguay
Brazilian expatriate sportspeople in Venezuela
Expatriate footballers in Paraguay
Expatriate footballers in Venezuela
Qatar Stars League players